Chira Ratanarat (born 3 June 1940 -13 March 2022) was the chief executive officer of The Siam Chemicals Public Company (SCC).

Life and work

Siam Chemicals 
After obtaining a master's degree in Automotive Engineering from the University of Stuttgart, Chira Ratanarat became the chief executive officer of The Siam Chemicals Public Company (SCC). The company had been founded by his father for the manufacture of basic chemicals for Thai downstream industries, such as sulfuric acid, hydrochloric acid, various bases and salts.

Chira Ratanarat modernised the business which now blends and trades various chemicals, fertilisers and lubricants. The company is now one of Thailand's largest lube makers. It produces 5 million litres per month and supplies to more than 60 brands in Asia with the plan to double capacity to 10 million litres by 2016.

Safe Flying Service 
He manages also the Safe Flying Service SFS Aviation which provide onshore and offshore helicopter flight services and runs an AgustaWestland Helicopter authorized maintenance service centre.

Radio control vehicles 
He is one of the pioneers of radio control (R/C) vehicles in Thailand. For more than twenty years he got deeply involved in R/C car racing and during that period he hosted two R/C Car World Championship racing events in Thailand.  He became champion on R/C scale car. Later he focussed on R/C flying and got interested in model jets and obtained his first two model turbine engines in 1995. He advises the Thai armee on the design and operation of unmanned aerial vehicles (UAVs) also known as drones.

Family 

He married in 1969 Khunying Thongtip Ratanarat and has with her three sons: Tisanu Ratanarat (born 1974), Sichart Ratanarat (born 1976) and Porapong Ratanarat (born 1982).

Honors 

Chira Ratanarat was honored with the German Federal Cross of Merit (German: Bundesverdienstkreuz), the highest federal decoration of Germany in recognition of his work related contributions to Germany.

He received the 1st Class Honour Award from King Hassan II of Morocco.

He is an honorary member  of the Alumni Network of the University of Stuttgart, which honors people, who have a special relationship to the University of Stuttgart or who are especially committed to the alumni program.

References 

Chira Ratanarat
Chira Ratanarat
Officers Crosses of the Order of Merit of the Federal Republic of Germany
1940 births
Living people
University of Stuttgart alumni